is a Japanese manga series by Takako Shimura. It was serialized in Ohta Publishing's manga magazine Manga Erotics F from 2002 to 2004 and was collected in two large-sized tankōbon volumes. The manga is a collection of short episodes that depict slightly eccentric love stories and mundane daily life in a matter-of-fact manner with a unique tempo and delicate psychological descriptions. Most of the episodes in the collection have direct sexual depictions, although they are drawn in a light-hearted way. The manga's title comes from the book Herahera Botchan by Kō Machida.

An anime film adaptation produced by Liden Films Kyoto Studio and directed by Takuya Satō premiered on October 23, 2020.

Characters

Media

Anime
An anime film adaptation was announced on November 20, 2019. The film is animated by Liden Films Kyoto Studio, distributed by Pony Canyon and directed by Takuya Satō, with Satō, Yasunori Ide, and Yoriko Tomita writing the scripts and Haruka Sagawa designing the characters. It was originally scheduled to premiere on May 8, 2020, but has been delayed to October 23, 2020 due to the COVID-19 pandemic. Asian Pop-up Cinema Festival streamed the film from September 15 to September 19, 2020. It has also been licensed by Sentai Filmworks.

Production
Although it has been almost 20 years since the manga's serialization, producer Yūsuke Terada thought that the "flat perspective on human relationships and love" of Shimura's work would be unique to today's age and planned the anime adaptation. In selecting the episodes, since the maximum length of the movie was decided in advance, the concept was set to "a story that reminds us of someone who is no longer around us, but who was once close to us." The four episodes that fit this concept were "Ecchan and Aya", "Mr. Sawa and Yagasaki", "Shin and Sayoko", and "Mika and Shin". In selecting the episodes, Shimura, the author of the original story, was consulted, but she had no objections because she liked the chosen episodes.

The main cast was chosen through a large audition, but Takahiro Sakurai and Seiichirō Yamashita were recommended by the director, Satō, who also served as sound director for the film. He demanded restrained acting and instructed the actors not to sigh. Mikako Komatsu, who played the role of Aya, said, "I was conscious of speaking clearly, but also of acting with realistic tension." Shimura also witnessed some of the recording process.

The theme song and the musical accompaniment was provided by the rock band CreepHyp. Initially, CreepHyp was only offered to compose background music for the film, but after reading the manga, Sekaikan Ozaki asked Terada if he could write a theme song as well. Shimura also knew CreepHyp from before and liked some of their songs. In addition, the theme song Monomane written for this film is a sequel to CreepHyp's previous song Boys END Girls. In creating the musical accompaniment, Ozaki did not decide on a scene and then write a song, but rather "just picked up a guitar and wrote songs that sounded like Happy-Go-Lucky Days, and then adjusted the scale of the finished songs to fit the necessary scenes." Terada said that this was a completely different way of creating the musical accompaniment to If My Favorite Pop Idol Made It to the Budokan, I Would Die, for which he had been the music producer prior to Happy-Go-Lucky Days.

References

External links
  
 
 

Anime postponed due to the COVID-19 pandemic
Liden Films
Ohta Publishing manga
Romance anime and manga